The James Watt Medal is an award for excellence in engineering established in 1937, conferred by the Institution of Mechanical Engineers in the United Kingdom. It is named after Scottish engineer James Watt (1736–1819) who developed the Watt steam engine in 1781, which was fundamental to the changes brought by the Industrial Revolution in both his native Great Britain and the rest of the world.

James Watt International Gold Medal of the Institution of Mechanical Engineers

The James Watt International Gold Medal is awarded by the British to an outstanding mechanical engineer.

"To commemorate the bicentenary of the birth of James Watt on 19 January 1736 - an event which was destined to bring about a revolution in the utilisation of power - the Institution of Mechanical Engineers award every two years a Gold Medal to an engineer of any nationality who is deemed worthy of the highest award the Institution can bestow and that a mechanical engineer can receive. In making the award, the Institution has sought the co-operation and advice of engineering Institutions and Societies in all parts of the world.
To be worthy to receive a medal struck in commemoration of one who was at one and the same time a scientist, an inventor and a producer, the recipient himself should be an engineer who has achieved international recognition both by his works as a mechanical engineer and by the ability with which he has applied science to the progress of mechanical engineering."

Recipients of the James Watt International Gold Medal are:

James Watt Medal of the Institution of Civil Engineers

The James Watt Medal is also a lesser known award of the British Institution of Civil Engineers (ICE) for energy engineers.
 
From the Institution of Civil Engineers website:

"The James Watt Medal is awarded for papers having a substantial mechanical engineering content. The medal, named after James Watt, the Scottish mechanical engineer and inventor who died in 1819, was introduced by Robert Stephenson (President of ICE in 1855-1856) who recommended Council to acquire the dies of the medal from Joseph S Wyon in 1858."

Recipients of the James Watt Medal of the Institution of Civil Engineers''' include:
1880s? Basil Wood for his work on Combined Heat and Power
2000 Paul Kassabian. Structural engineer with interests in design, dynamic control, and deployable structures.
2000 Professor Sergio Pellegrino. Professor of Structural Engineering at the University of Cambridge. Specializes in deployable lightweight structures.
2005 Choo Yoo Sang, J W Boh, and L Louca.
2009 Dick Fenner and Joan Ko for "Adoption of energy efficiency innovations in new UK housing"
2010 Neil Chapman for paper on radioactive waste disposal
2014 Malcolm Joyce
2019 Tobias Lühn and Jutta Geldermann for "Optimising power grids using batteries and fuzzy control of photovoltaic generation"

See also

 List of engineering awards
 List of mechanical engineering awards

References

Awards of the Institution of Civil Engineers
Awards of the Institution of Mechanical Engineers
Medal
1937 establishments in the United Kingdom
Awards established in 1937